Lieutenant Robert Hood (1797–21 October 1821), born in Portarlington, Ireland, was an Anglo-Irish Royal Navy officer, explorer of the Canadian Arctic, and military artist.

In 1819, Hood was appointed midshipman on the Coppermine expedition, where he, along with George Back, was an official artist. In addition to documenting the expedition with watercolour paintings, he kept a journal which was used by John Franklin to complete his official account of the expedition, and recorded important meteorological, magnetic and auroral data. Hood was the first person to note the electromagnetic nature of the Aurora Borealis.

In 1820, while overwintering in Fort Enterprise, Hood fathered a baby girl with a fifteen-year-old Yellowknives girl known as Greenstockings, whose family was also staying there for the winter. Prior to this, he and Back almost fought a duel over the affections of Greenstockings.

Hood was murdered on 21 October 1821 by an Iroquois voyageur, Michel Terohaute (who had by this time become a cannibal), who was summarily executed by John Richardson a few days later.  Hood's promotion to lieutenant came in January 1821, the news of which did not reach the party until December 15, 1821.

See also

Edward Nicholas Kendall

References

19th-century Anglo-Irish people
Royal Navy officers
Arctic expeditions
Explorers of Canada
1797 births
1821 deaths
History of the Arctic
Cannibalism